F. W. Woolworth & Co (Cyprus) Ltd was, until the end of 2003, the leading chain of upmarket department stores on the island of Cyprus with branches in all the major cities. The Cyprus company had its roots in the American parent F. W. Woolworth Company in the 1950s, which used its British arm to spread Woolworths stores throughout the British Empire.

Initially there was only one Woolworths in Cyprus, in the capital city Nicosia, but in 1985 the company was sold to the local businessman Nicolas Shacolas (now OBE) who rapidly opened new stores in the island's other cities. These were far more upmarket than the original British Woolworths, and sold a range of designer adult clothing, perfumes and other luxury goods, as well as running food supermarkets in the stores.

At the end of 2003 the Shacolas Group reorganised the Woolworths company by splitting it in two, effectively severing the vestigial ties it had with the British company. The running of the department stores passed to a company called Ermes Department Stores Public Limited, and after an initial rebranding of the stores as Ermes, they were renamed a year later Debenhams.

The ownership of the land and property, as well as responsibility for developing new commercial sites, remained with F. W. Woolworth & Co (Cyprus) Ltd, which was renamed Woolworths (Cyprus) Properties Public Limited in 2005. This is the only part of the Shacolas Group to retain the Woolworths name. Woolworths (Cyprus) Properties Public Limited is now one of the leading developers of commercial shopping centres in Cyprus, with increasing interests elsewhere in southern Europe.

References

Retail companies of Cyprus
Cyprus